Yuri Sergeyevich Rytkheu (8 March 1930 – 14 May 2008) was a Chukchi writer, who wrote in both his native Chukchi and in Russian. He is considered to be the father of Chukchi literature.

Early life
Yuri Rytkheu was born 8 March 1930 to a family of trappers and hunters. His birthplace, the village of Uelen, was then in the Chukotka District, Far Eastern Territory, RSFSR, USSR; it is now part of the Chukotka Autonomous Okrug. His grandfather was a shaman.

At birth, he was given the name "Rytgėv", which means "forgotten" in the Chukchi language (from the Chukchi word "рытгэватъё" (rytgėvatʺjo) – "unremembered" or "forgotten"). Since Soviet institutions did not recognize Chukchi names and the Chukchi do not commonly use surnames, in order to obtain his passport he used his first name as his surname and assumed the first name and patronymic of a Russian geologist he knew.

He graduated from the Soviet 7-year school in Uelen. He wanted to continue his education at the Institute of the Peoples of the North, but was not selected to study there, because of his young age. Consequently, he decided to go to Leningrad on his own, to continue his study. This travel was delayed for several years. In order to earn money for this journey, the future writer took odd jobs; for instance, he worked on the seas and on geological expeditions and trapped animals, stevedored at a hydrography base. He moved to Anadyr and enrolled in a vocational school. In 1947 he started writing articles for the Anadyr district-based magazine Soviet Chukotka (Советская Чукотка), which published his first stories and poems. In Anadyr, he met the Leningrad-based scholar , who was leading a linguistic expedition in the area and who was responsible for helping the young writer move to Leningrad.

Career: Soviet years
From 1949 until 1954 he studied literature at Leningrad State University. In 1953, the publishing company Molodaya Gvardiya (Young Guard) published his first collection of stories The People of Our Coast (Люди нашего берега), in Russian. This book was later translated into Chukchi by A. Smolyana (А. Смоляна). While still a student, Rytkheu also translated the works of Pushkin, Tolstoy, Gorky and  into Chukchi. In 1954, he was accepted into the USSR Union of Writers.

Upon graduating from Leningrad University, he spent a few years living in Magadan, working as a correspondent for the newspaper Magadanskaya Pravda. After two years in Magadan, a collection short stories Chukotkan Saga (Чукотская сага) was published, and brought the writer recognition from both Soviet and foreign readers.

After Magadan, he moved to Leningrad, where he spent the rest of his life. In 1967, he joined the Communist Party.

Post-Soviet career
After the collapse of the Soviet Union, his works were no longer published in the new post-Soviet states. Finding himself in a difficult position, he even said that he would emigrate to the United States. However, through Chinghiz Aitmatov, he met with  Lucien Leitess, founder of the Swiss publishing company, who signed a contract to publish Rytkheu's works in German, and who would go on to become his literary agent. Rytkheu's works were introduced to readers in France, Finland, the Netherlands, Italy, Germany, Spain, Japan, and other countries. The German editions of his books have sold more than 250,000 copies. The situation in Russia, however, was quite the opposite since the time his book Путешествие в молодости (Youthful Travels) was published in 1991. Beginning in 2000, the Governor of Chukotka, Roman Abramovich, sponsored the distribution of a small run of Rytkeu's works in Russia, approximately one a year, all of which were issued only in Chukotka. The first of these books was a new work called In the Mirror of Oblivion (В зеркале забвения).

His works have been translated into numerous languages, including several national languages of the former USSR. In addition, the composer Eduard Artemyev set his poems to music in a 1985 vocal-instrumental suite The Warmth of the Earth (Тепло Земли). Only a few of his works have been translated into English, including A Dream in Polar Fog, originally published in 1970, which was published by Archipelago Books in 2005.

Other activities and death
He travelled extensively around the world on creative trips and with cultural and goodwill visits. As he spoke fluent English, he was invited to give lectures at American universities. He also worked with UNESCO for a time.

He died in Saint Petersburg on 14 May 2008, after a long battle with myeloma. He is buried in  near the grave of his wife.

Evolution and reception
Colin Thubron summarized his career as follows:
For his earlier books, there are those who never forgave him. His slavish pursuit of the Party line and open repudiation of his people's traditions are embarrassingly manifest in works that celebrate the (nonexistent) transformation of his native Chukotka into a Soviet paradigm. ... But by the late 1970s, as the slow literary thaw continued, he started to write differently. Perhaps influenced by the derevenshchiki, the "village writers" who turned for their values to the unspoiled countryside, he began to extol precisely the Chukchi oral culture that he had once repudiated.

Works in translation
All of Rytkheu's works are related in some way to the lives of the Chukchi:

Catalan
Transliteration of author's name into Catalan: Iuri S. Ritkheu.
 El darrer xaman txuktxi, (Pagès editors, 2007). 

English
 Reborn to a Full Life, (Moscow : Novosti Press Agency Pub. House, 1977).
 From Nomad Tent to University, (Moscow : Novosti Press Agency, 1980).
 Old Memyl Laughs Last: Short Stories, (Moscow: Foreign Languages Pub. House, no date).
 A Dream in Polar Fog, trans. by Ilona Yazhbin Chavasse (New York: Archipelago Books, 2006). 
 The Chukchi Bible, trans. by Ilona Yazhbin Chavasse (New York: Archipelago Books, 2009). 
 When the Whales Leave, trans. by Ilona Yazhbin Chavasse (Minneapolis: Milkweed Editions, 2019). 

French
Transliteration of author's name into French: Youri Rytkhèou.
 L'Étrangère aux yeux bleus, (Babel Series, Actes Sud, 2002). Original title in Russian: Anna Odintzowa (Zurich: Unionsverlag, 1998).

German
In German, the author's name is transliterated as Juri Rytchëu.
 Der Mondhund 
Unna 
Der letzte Schamane  (The Chukchi Bible)
Die Reise der Anna Odinzova 
Traum im Polarnebel (1993)  (A Dream in Polar Fog)
Die Suche nach der letzten Zahl 
Wenn die Wale fortziehen  (When the Whales Leave)
Unter dem Sternbild der Trauer 
Im Spiegel des Vergessens  (In the Mirror of Oblivion)

Russian
"В зеркале забвения"   (In the Mirror of Oblivion)

Honours
 Maxim Gorky RSFSR State Prize (1977), for the novel, "The end of the Permafrost" (Конец вечной мерзлоты).
Orders: Order of the Red Banner of Labour, Order of Friendship of Peoples, Order of the Badge of Honor

References

External links
 Chukchee author Yuri Rytkheu dies
 Выставка «Чукотская сага», piterbook.spb.ru  
 Юрий Рытхэу: Внук шамана и экологический шпион, Александр Карлюкевич, Российская Газета, 25 March 2004 
 Морж на галечной отмели, Михаил Бойко, Литературная Россия, 23 February 2007 
 Obituary 17 May 2008 

Chukchi people
Communist Party of the Soviet Union members
Russian male essayists
Russian male short story writers
Soviet writers
1930 births
2008 deaths
Deaths from multiple myeloma
People from Chukotka Autonomous Okrug
20th-century Russian short story writers
20th-century essayists
Russian-language writers
Chukchi-language writers